Daniel Delgadillo Faisal (born 27 September 1989) is a Mexican marathon swimmer. He competed in the 2020 Summer Olympics.

References

External links
 

1989 births
Living people
Mexican male long-distance swimmers
Olympic swimmers of Mexico
Swimmers at the 2020 Summer Olympics
Sportspeople from San Luis Potosí
People from San Luis Potosí City